Flin Flon (pop. 5,185 in 2016 census; 4,982 in Manitoba and 205 in Saskatchewan) is a mining city, located on a correction line on the border of the Canadian provinces of Manitoba and Saskatchewan, with the majority of the city located within Manitoba. Residents thus travel southwest into Saskatchewan, and northeast into Manitoba. The city is incorporated in and is jointly administered by both provinces.

Etymology

The town's name is taken from the lead character in a 1905 paperback novel, The Sunless City by J. E. Preston Muddock. Josiah Flintabbatey Flonatin piloted a submarine into a bottomless lake where he sailed through a hole lined with gold to enter a strange underground world. A copy of the book was allegedly found and read by prospector Tom Creighton.

When Tom Creighton discovered a high-grade exposure of copper, he thought of the book and called it Flin Flon's mine, and the town that developed around the mine adopted the name. Flin Flon shares the distinction of being named after a character in an adventure novel with Tarzana, California and Le Plessis-Robinson, France.

The character of "Flinty", as he is locally known, is of such importance to the identity of the city that in 2003, the local Chamber of Commerce commissioned the minting of a $3.00 coin which was considered legal tender amongst locally participating retailers until September 2004  and a $5.00 coin which was in circulation until December 31, 2008. A statue representing Flinty was designed by cartoonist Al Capp and is one of the points of interest of the city. In 1978, the National Film Board of Canada produced the short documentary Canada Vignettes: Flin Flon about the origin of the city's name.

History 
Flin Flon was founded in 1927 by Hudson Bay Mining and Smelting (Hudbay) to exploit the large local copper and zinc ore resources. In the late 1920s, HBM&S invested in a railway, mine, smelter, and a hydroelectric power plant at Island Falls, Saskatchewan. By 1928, the rail line reached the mine.

The town grew considerably during the 1930s as those impoverished by the Great Depression came to work at the mines. A significant number of farmers abandoned their farms and were among those looking for work. The municipality was incorporated on January 1, 1933, and reached city status in 1970. The city has continued to be a mining centre with the development of several mines adding to its industrial base, although its population has been in decline since the 1960s. With a scenic setting and a number of nearby lakes, Flin Flon has also become a popular tourist destination.

Geography

Flin Flon straddles the provincial boundary of Manitoba and Saskatchewan with the majority of the city located in Manitoba. The 2016 census reported 4,982 residents in the Manitoba portion and 203 in the Saskatchewan section; the Manitoba portion has a land area of 13.88 km2 (5.4 sq mi), while the Saskatchewan portion has a land area of 2.37 km2 (0.91 sq mi). Due to the zig-zag nature of the Saskatchewan-Manitoba boundary correction lines, the Saskatchewan section of town lies south of the Manitoba section, not west. 
Main Street crosses the provincial boundary just south of its intersection with Church Street; Hudson Street crosses the provincial boundary between its intersections with 5 Ave E. and Harrison Street, adopting the new name South Hudson Street at the point of crossing; an undeveloped stretch of Channing Drive briefly crosses into Saskatchewan before reentering Manitoba just west of the city's rural Channing neighbourhood.

For Canada Post purposes, residents in the Saskatchewan portion of the city retain the local Manitoba R8A postal code, and often use a Flin Flon, MB address. For telephone service, however, they are located in Saskatchewan's area code 306 as part of the Creighton telephone exchange, rather than Manitoba's area code 204, which causes difficulties with emergency services. A resident in the Saskatchewan section of the city who calls 911 in an emergency will have services dispatched from Creighton rather than Flin Flon, and must instead call a regular phone number to receive immediate city-based service. However, residents in Saskatchewan may use either Saskatchewan's SaskTel or Manitoba's Bell MTS systems for cellular services. Electrical service is received from Manitoba Hydro for both the Manitoba and Saskatchewan parts of the city.

The majority of Flin Flon's surface topology is exposed Canadian Shield bedrock, hence the nickname "the city built on rock". The extensive bedrock exposure led to some interesting adaptations. In the northwestern areas of the city, there is often not enough overburden to bury water and sewer lines, so "sewer boxes" exist above surface to house the infrastructure. Many of these are used as ad-hoc sidewalks.

Climate
Flin Flon experiences a humid continental climate (Köppen climate classification Dfb). There is a wide range in seasonal temperatures, with warm summers and bitterly cold winters.

Demographics

Transportation

Road
Flin Flon is accessed by Manitoba Provincial Trunk Highway 10, Saskatchewan Highway 106 and Saskatchewan Highway 167. The city also runs a small public bus system.

Air

The city operates Flin Flon Airport, which is located southeast of the city, immediately west of the Bakers Narrows Provincial Park. The airport has a single asphalt runway, and has regular flights to and from Winnipeg through Calm Air. There is also an airport in nearby Channing, MB for small aircraft use.

Rail
The Hudson Bay Railway operates railway freight service on its railway line between The Pas and Flin Flon.

The rail line to Churchill was washed out in June 2017 and remained out of service for over a year when then-owner Omnitrax refused to repair it. The City of Flin Flon purchased shares in One North, one of the partners of purchasing consortium Arctic Gateway Group Limited Partnership. The rail line was subsequently repaired by Cando Rail Services and Paradox Access Solutions.

Economy

Main employers

Note that the number of workers with the classification of "Mining" will be highly variable following the June 2022 closure of the 777 mine and the planned impending closure of the majority of the Hudbay Flin Flon operations.

Mining

The economy of Flin Flon was primarily reliant on base metal production (primarily copper and zinc with lesser gold and silver). Since the late 1910s, approximately 17 mines have operated in the Flin Flon vicinity. The most recent mine, the 777 Mine, closed in June 2022 with decommissioning completed shortly thereafter.

Sphalerite (zinc) concentrate was produced and processed on-site to refined zinc while chalcopyrite (copper) concentrate was produced and sold for external copper production. Prior to the smelter closure in 2010, the chalcopyrite concentrate was refined on location.
 Although processing of any sulphide material usually emits large amounts of sulfur dioxide, the Hudbay plant uses a zinc pressure leaching (ZPL) process which greatly reduces emissions.

Marijuana production 
Flin Flon gained international notoriety in 2002 when the Government of Canada awarded a four-year contract to Saskatoon-based Prairie Plant Systems for the production of medicinal marijuana. The company set up operations in a mined-out area of the then-active Trout Lake Mine, an underground copper/zinc mine located just over 5 km northeast of Flin Flon city limits and owned by the Hudson Bay Mining and Smelting Company (later Hudbay) to produce approximately 400 kilograms (882 lbs) of medicinal marijuana annually. The entire operation was situated approximately 120 metres underground for security and climate control reasons.

In 2009, Prairie Plant Systems discontinued operation at the mine due to the expiry of their lease and the uncertainty regarding the pending closure of the mine, which occurred in 2011.

Culture

Arts
Flin Flon has an active local arts & culture scene. The Flin Flon Arts Council has been instrumental in building the local arts scene of late, and has also brought high-quality performers, such as the Royal Winnipeg Ballet, into the community for special events. The R.H. Channing Auditorium in the Flin Flon Community Hall often hosts concerts and theatrical performances, including those produced by the local theatre troupe "Ham Sandwich".

In 2010, the Northern Visual Arts Centre (or NorVA) was established as a studio and gallery space for local visual artists. NorVA frequently hosts workshops, concerts and other community arts-based events.

Every two years, the Flin Flon Community Choir performs a largely extravagant musical production for the community. In 2013, the Flin Flon Community Choir presented Chicago: The Musical, to great acclaim. In 2015, they presented Les Miserables, Grease in 2017, and Mama Mia in 2019. Past performances have included Beauty and the Beast, Fiddler on the Roof, and Bombertown, among many others.

Culture Days, a national festival celebrating arts and culture, is a popular event in Flin Flon. Culture Days is held on the last weekend of September each year. In 2018, Flin Flon ranked second in the country, only following Winnipeg, for the number of free events (including concerts, workshops, artist talks and kids' activities) offered to community members and visitors. Toronto followed Flin Flon with the number of events, ranking third, down from second in 2017.

Flin Flon is the fictional home of the comic book superhero Captain Canuck.

Petting zoo 
The City operates the Joe Brain Petting Zoo. It is open from June through August, weather permitting. It features a picnic area, playground, basketball hoops, and a wading pool.

Sports

Flin Flon is the home of the Flin Flon Bombers of the Saskatchewan Junior Hockey League and the birthplace of NHL great and Hall of Fame member Bobby Clarke. As captain of the team, he led the Philadelphia Flyers to two NHL Stanley Cup championships in the 1970s, and was a star on the 1972 Team Canada Summit Series roster. Other NHLers hailing from Flin Flon include Ken Baird, Ken Baumgartner, Matt Davidson, Kim Davis, Dean Evason, Al Hamilton, Ted Hampson (who was captain of the Flin Flon Bombers Memorial Cup team in 1957 and the second player to ever receive the Bill Masterton Memorial Trophy), Gerry Hart, Ron Hutchinson, George Konik, Ray Maluta, Tom Gilmore, Dunc McCallum, Eric Nesterenko, Mel Pearson, Reid Simpson, David Struch, and Ernie Wakely.

Media
Newspapers & magazines
The Reminder – published every Wednesday – Flin Flon's only newspaper.
Northroots Magazine – a bi-monthly glossy, regional publication, northroots.ca published February, April, June, August, October and December. In-flight reading on Calm Air.
Cottage North Magazine – local interest, local stories, and local people – ceased publication in September 2015

Books
Tales From a Town With a Funny Name – by Doug Evans.

Radio
CFAR 590 (AM), 102.9 (FM)
CBWF-FM 90.9, (CBC Radio One)
CKSB-4-FM 99.9, (Première Chaîne)
CIFF-FM 101.1, (NCI)

Television
CKYF-TV channel 13 (CTV, analogue repeater of CKY-DT Winnipeg)
Shaw Communications operates a community programming channel; CATV Channel 11: Shaw TV

Television in Flin Flon began in June 1962 with the opening of CBC Television station CBWBT channel 10. The station broadcast kine recordings, sent to the transmitter from CBWT Winnipeg. On March 1, 1969, the province-wide microwave system replaced the kine recordings originating at CBWT, giving citizens of Flin Flon access to live television. The repeater (along with Radio-Canada repeater CBWFT-2 channel 3) closed down July 31, 2012, due to the CBC's closure of its rebroadcasters.

Law and government

Municipal 

The operations of the City of Flin Flon are administered by the city council, whose members set the policies. The city council consists of a mayor and six councillors who are elected and serve a term of four years. The current council was elected on October 24, 2018, and consists of the following members:

Provincial

Flin Flon is in the southwest corner of the Manitoba provincial electoral district of the same name, and is the only urban centre within the district. The current Member of the Legislative Assembly is NDP Tom Lindsey, who was re-elected in the 2019 election.

The Saskatchewan portion of Flin Flon is in the electoral district of Cumberland. It is represented by Doyle Vermette of the NDP.

Federal

Flin Flon, Manitoba, is in the federal riding of Churchill-Keewatinook Aski. The current Member of Parliament (MP) is NDP member Niki Ashton.

The Saskatchewan portion of Flin Flon is in the electoral district of Desnethé—Missinippi—Churchill River, whose current MP is CPC member Gary Vidal.

Notable people
 Jared Abrahamson, actor
 Roger Avary, film and television director, screenwriter, and producer
 Ken Baumgartner (born 1966), ice hockey player
 Bobby Clarke (born 1949), hockey player
 Kim Davis, hockey player
 Dean Evason (born 1964), hockey coach
 Tom Gilmore (born 1948), hockey player
 Al Hamilton (born 1946), hockey player
 Ted Hampson (born 1936), hockey player, hockey coach, amateur hockey scout
 Marshall Lawrence (born 1956), blues musician and psychologist
 Ray Martynuik (19502013), hockey player
 Andrea Menard (born 1971), actress and singer
 Eric Nesterenko (1933–2022), hockey player
 Mel Pearson (19381999), hockey player
 Dennis Schneider (born 1942), politician
 Birk Sproxton (19432007), poet and novelist

See also
Flin Flon greenstone belt
Lloydminster
Texarkana

References

Notes

External links

 
1927 establishments in Manitoba
Borders of Manitoba
Borders of Saskatchewan
Cities in Manitoba
Cities in Saskatchewan
Company towns in Canada
Divided cities
Division No. 18, Saskatchewan
Populated places established in 1927
Volcanogenic massive sulfide ore deposits